Daulton is an unincorporated community in Madera County, California.

A post office operated at Daulton from 1899 to 1908. The name honors Henry C. Daulton, chairman of the commission that established Madera County, who gave the railroad right of way on his land.

References

Unincorporated communities in California
Unincorporated communities in Madera County, California